Cruel Passion (also known as Justine) is a 1977 film starring Koo Stark, Martin Potter, Lydia Lisle, and Katherine Kath. It was directed by Chris Boger and based on the 1791 novel Justine by the Marquis de Sade.

Plot
Justine is a young virgin thrown out of a French orphanage and into the depraved world of prostitution. She slips into a life of debauchery, torture, whipping, slavery and salaciousness while her brazen, flirtatious and liberated sister Juliette ironically receives nothing but happiness and reward for her wanton behavior.

Cast
Koo Stark as Justine Jerome
Martin Potter as Lord Carlisle
Lydia Lisle as Juliette Jerome
Katherine Kath as Madame Laronde
Hope Jackman as Mrs Bonny
Barry McGinn as George
Louis Ife as Pastor John
Maggie Petersen as Mother Superior
David Masterman as Archer
Ian McKay as Brough
Ann Michelle as Pauline

Release

Home media
The DVD is now available uncut in the United Kingdom as "Cruel Passion" and in the United States as  "Marquis de Sade's Justine"

References

External links

British exploitation films
Films about virginity
Films based on works by the Marquis de Sade
1977 films
Films based on French novels
Films set in France
Films shot in Hong Kong
1970s English-language films
1970s British films